The Guldbagge for Best Makeup and Hair is a Swedish film award presented annually by the Swedish Film Institute (SFI) as part of the Guldbagge Awards (Swedish: "Guldbaggen") to make-up artists working in the Swedish motion picture industry.

Winners and nominees 
Each Guldbagge Awards ceremony is listed chronologically below along with the winner of the Guldbagge Award for Best Makeup and Hair and the film associated with the award. In the columns under the winner of each award are the other nominees for best makeup and hairstyling.

2010s

2020s

See also 
 Guldbagge Awards
 Academy Award for Best Makeup and Hairstyling
 BAFTA Award for Best Makeup and Hair
 Critics' Choice Movie Award for Best Makeup
 Saturn Award for Best Make-up

Notes and references

External links 
  
  
 

Makeup and Hair
Film awards for makeup and hairstyling
Makeup and Hair
Awards established in 2011